The Sheikh Ali are a major tribe of Hazaras. Inhabiting  in Afghanistan generally in Parwan (Sheikh Ali District), Kunduz, Baghlan and Bamyan provinces and in other parts of the country.

History 
In the late 19th century, Ishaq Khan rebelled against Afghan king Abdur Rahman Khan at Mazar-e Sharif. Abdur Rahman sent a force against Ishaq Khan, passing through the Sheikh Ali territory. During their passage, the force faced many skirmishes with the local Sheikh Ali over the scarce food and fodder. Once Abdur Rahman quashed the rebellion of Ishaq, he then focused on Sheikh Ali Hazaras. The Sheikh Ali also resisted, this low-level but violent expedition by Abdur Rahman forced the Hazaras at large to rise against Abdur Rahman, in retaliation for the attacks on the Sheikh Ali Hazaras. This Hazara uprising resulted in the Jang-i-Uruzgan ("Battle of Uruzgan").

Thereafter, Sheikh Ali faced a severe backlash from Abdur Rahman, who forcibly evicted many of them from their lands. During this process and there esattled in Kunduz, many of the Sheikh Ali Hazaras perished. After these massacres, causing some many Hazaras fled to neighbouring countries.

Pishin Sheikh Alis 
A Sunni Sheikh Ali Hazara family settled in British India present-day Pishin, Pakistan, north of Quetta. This family rose to prominence and its members Qazi Muhammad Essa and Qazi Muhammad Musa were among the top Muslim League leaders of Baluchistan during the Pakistan Movement. Ashraf Jehangir Qazi son of Qazi Musa is a prominent Pakistani diplomat and has remained Pakistan's ambassador to United States, India and the United Nations. He was also the UNSG special representative in Iraq and Sudan. Qazi Faiz Essa the current Chief Justice of the Balochistan High court is also from this family. Qazi Essa helped the Hazaras from Quetta in sending the first Hazara delegation to United Nations in the 1970s.

Tribes 
The Sheikh Ali tribes are Dai Kalan, Naiman, Qarlugh, Karam Ali and Babur.

Present 
Today most of the Sunni Hazaras are from Sheikh Ali, besides from Surkhi Parsa, Taimani and the Hazara-i-ghorband. Some of the Sheikh Ali Hazaras also converted to the Ismaili Shia sect, who mostly inhabit Bamiyan and Baghlan provinces. Sayed Mansur Naderi (in Pul-i-Khumri), a Sheikh Ali Sayd Hazara, is the representative of the Agha Khan in Afghanistan. He was appointed a brigadier in the communist Democratic Republic of Afghanistan and was the main person to contact in maintaining the channels between the Afghan government and the West through the French government.

Prominent Figures: Sayed Mustafa Kazimi, former Minister of Economy of the Islamic Republic of Afghanistan, leader of a political party (Eqtedar-e Meli)- Sayed Hussain Anwari, former Minister of Agriculture, and former Governor of Kabul and Herat provinces of the Islamic Republic of Afghanistan, leader of a political party (Harakat-e Islami)- Haji Rais, MP and Commander during the civil war - Firoz Alizada, disarmament campaigner and a prominent disability rights advocate at 1997 Nobel Peace Prize Laureate campaign ICBL in Geneva - Mohammad Sadiq Mohibi, Advisor to Deputy Minister of the Ministry of Martyrs and Disabled of the Islamic Republic of Afghanistan.

See also 
 List of Hazara tribes
 Hazara people 
 Hazarajat
 Parwan Province
 Shekh Ali District

References 

Hazara tribes